Pedare Christian College is a joint Independent, junior, middle and senior school in South Australia. The junior school comprises reception to year 5, the middle school years 6 to 9, and the senior school years 10 to 12.

This school is a member of the Association of Independent Schools of South Australia, the Anglican Schools Heads Group, the Uniting Church Educational Ministries Commission, the Junior School Heads Association of Australia and the South Australian Christian Schools Association.

The Surrey Farm campus shares facilities with Gleeson College and Golden Grove High School, resulting in an extended curriculum and extra resources. Pedare Christian College is governed by a college board containing members elected from the college community, and representatives from the Anglican and Uniting churches.

History 
The name "Pedare" originally came from a vineyard on Ladywood Road, Modbury Heights, owned by Leonard Tolley. It was formed from the names of his sons, Peter, David, and Reginald. The joint campus was originally going to be on this location but it was decided otherwise. That location is now The Heights School.

The founders decided to use the name "Pedare" to recognise the past pioneers. The names of the five communities, or houses, of the school also came from surrounding areas. Eldergreen, from Elder Green Farm, Brooklyn, from Brooklyn Villa Farm, Greenwith, from Greenwith Farm, Surrey, from Surrey Farm and Hillcott, from Hillcott Farm.

In 1984, Delfin Management Services were developing land in Golden Grove, along with Urban Land Trust. They came up with the idea to make a joint school, and contacted the Pedare foundation planning committee to see if they wanted to join this scheme, saying two of the joint schools would be a Catholic College, and a Government High School. Pedare agreed. Pedare Christian College had its first official school day in 1986. There were 900 students, spread through Years 7 and 8. By 1990 Pedare had enrolments in all Secondary School levels, Years 8 to 12. In 1991 the school board decided to form a Primary school, and located it at nearby Bicentennial Drive.

In 2005, Years 6 to 9 were relocated to the Surrey Farm Campus, forming a middle school.

Location 
The Junior, Middle and Senior Schools are now all on the same campus. All campuses are located in Golden Grove, South Australia, off Surrey Farm Drive.

Events
 Swimming Carnival
 Athletics Carnival
 Spring Carnival/Spring Challenge (known as 'Foundation Day' in 2015 to celebrate 30 years of the college)
 Cross Country
 Colour Run (one time)

Notable alumni
Stuart Cochrane (1991–1995) – Australian rules football for the North Melbourne Football Club and Port Adelaide.
Trent Dumont – Australian rules football for the North Melbourne Football Club.
Mark Ormrod (1996–2001) – Olympic medallist (2004 Olympics, 4 × 400 metres relay).

See also
List of schools in South Australia

References

External links 
 Pedare Christian College Website
 Association of Independent Schools of South Australia

Anglican primary schools in Adelaide
Anglican secondary schools in Adelaide
Uniting Church schools in Australia
Junior School Heads Association of Australia Member Schools
Educational institutions established in 1986
International Baccalaureate schools in Australia
1986 establishments in Australia